Imura (written: 井村 lit. "well village") is a Japanese surname. Notable people with the surname include:

, Japanese inventor and businessman
, Japanese synchronized swimmer and coach
Takenori Imura (born 1952), Japanese karateka
, Japanese footballer

See also
Murai (surname)

Japanese-language surnames